Kazuo Yamagishi (1934-2015) was a Japanese chef, who is known for inventing the tsukemen dish. He was born in Nagano Prefecture, and came upon the idea of Tsukemen at the age of 17 after seeing a co-worker eating noodles dipped in a soup bowl. In 1961, he added tsukemen, then named "special morisoba", to his Taishoken restaurant.

The 2013 documentary The God of Ramen, follows 13 years in his life.

References 

1934 births
2015 deaths
Japanese chefs
People from Nagano Prefecture